George Puce (: born December 29, 1940, in Jelgava) is a retired discus thrower, who represented Canada at the 1968 Summer Olympics. He won the bronze medal in the men's discus throw event at the 1967 Pan American Games.

References
 Canadian Olympic Committee

1940 births
Living people
Canadian people of Latvian descent
Canadian male discus throwers
Commonwealth Games gold medallists for Canada
Commonwealth Games silver medallists for Canada
Commonwealth Games bronze medallists for Canada
Commonwealth Games medallists in athletics
Athletes (track and field) at the 1966 British Empire and Commonwealth Games
Athletes (track and field) at the 1967 Pan American Games
Athletes (track and field) at the 1968 Summer Olympics
Athletes (track and field) at the 1970 British Commonwealth Games
Olympic track and field athletes of Canada
Sportspeople from Ontario
Pan American Games bronze medalists for Canada
Pan American Games medalists in athletics (track and field)
Universiade medalists in athletics (track and field)
Universiade bronze medalists for Canada
Medalists at the 1965 Summer Universiade
Medalists at the 1967 Pan American Games
Medallists at the 1966 British Empire and Commonwealth Games
Medallists at the 1970 British Commonwealth Games